My Darling is a town in Capricorn District Municipality in the Limpopo province of South Africa. It is located northwest of the Makgabeng Plateau, known for Hananwa rock art. It is also located south of the Kingdom of Mapungubwe. My Darling is planned on an orthogonal street system. The streets remain unpaved. The houses are primarily constructed with modern methods, but there is also a mixture of traditional Rondavel structures. My Darling also has a substantial area dedicated to farming.

References

External links
 http://www.dailymaverick.co.za/article/2013-08-20-makgabeng-limpopos-protest-art-a-century-before/#.V4FEFVdBuuU
 http://www.sowetanlive.co.za/goodlife/2015/02/21/happy-folk-embraced-by-giants

Populated places in the Blouberg Local Municipality